HMS Codrington was one of nine s built for the Royal Navy during the 1920s. She was the flotilla leader for the class. During the Second World War she served in Home waters and off the Norwegian coast, before being bombed and sunk on 27 July 1940 whilst in dock at Dover.

Construction and commissioning
HMS Codrington was ordered on 6 March 1928 from the yards of Swan Hunter & Wigham Richardson, Wallsend, under the 1927 Naval Estimates. She was laid down on 20 June 1928 and was launched a year later on 8 August 1929. She was commissioned on 4 June 1930. She has so far been the only ship of the Royal Navy to be named HMS Codrington, after Admiral Sir Edward Codrington, commander of the allied fleet at the Battle of Navarino.

Codrington was a flotilla leader and therefore larger than the other A-class destroyers. Her bridge structure was larger to provide the additional accommodation required for the Flotilla Staff. Some smaller weapons were fitted for use against aircraft. The ship had two quadruple  torpedo tube mountings and for attacks on submarines was fitted with four depth charge chutes and two throwers, and an additional  gun fitted between the two funnels.

Pre-war operations
After working up, in July 1930 Codridgton joined the 3rd Destroyer Flotilla as part of the Mediterranean as leader. In June 1931, the destroyer returned to Devonport Naval Base for modifications to her turbines, returning to the Mediterranean at the end of the month after the completion of the modifications. Codrington was refitted again at Devonport in September–October 1932, again returning to the 3rd Flotilla. She spent a period in the reserve at Devonport Naval Base, but was refitted in 1938, being recommissioned on completion of the refit in August 1939 in time to participate in the Second World War.

Wartime career

The English Channel and French coast

After being recommissioned after her refit, Codrington was nominated as the leader of the 19th Destroyer Flotilla, as part of the Nore Command. She then took passage to Sheerness to take up her war station. She sailed to Dover in September and on 4 September began to escort the convoys carrying the British Expeditionary Force to France. She remained in the English Channel throughout October, before being transferred to Harwich to defend against a perceived threat of a German attack on the Low Countries. She was back in Dover in December, and on 4 December Codrington embarked King George VI and transported him to Boulogne for his visit to the British Expeditionary Force in France. Codrington re-embarked him on 10 December and brought him back to Dover.

1940 saw Codrington continue to host VIPs, as on 4 January, she embarked Winston Churchill (then First Lord of the Admiralty) on a visit to France. In February, she was nominated as the flotilla leader of the 1st Destroyer Flotilla based at Harwich, replacing , which had been sunk by a mine on 19 January. On 5 February, she carried Prime Minister Neville Chamberlain, Winston Churchill and several high-ranking military leaders to Boulogne for a war council meeting in Paris. Codrington then put into Chatham Dockyard for a refit.

The North Sea and Norwegian coast
On completion of the refit, she joined the flotilla at Harwich on 6 March and began convoy defence and patrol duties in the North Sea. In April, she was transferred for detached service with the Home Fleet after the German invasion of Norway. The fleet was to cover planned operations off Norway, including Operation Rupert, a minelaying mission to prevent German ships carrying iron ore. The operation was overtaken though by the sudden German invasion the following day on 8 April. Codrington came under air attack on 9 April whilst with the fleet, and was detached to return to Sullom Voe for refuelling.

On 28 April, Codrington embarked Admiral of the Fleet, the Earl of Cork and Orrery and the French General Antoine Béthouart. They carried out a reconnaissance of the Narvik area, in preparation for the later assaults by allied troops. During the survey, Codrington carried out bombardments of enemy gun positions.

Covering the evacuations
She was released from the Home Fleet deployment off Norway in May, and on 10 May took passage to Dover to support the evacuation of allied personnel from Belgium and the Netherlands. She managed to complete the  passage from Scapa Flow to Dover in just 23 hours. She refuelled on 11 May and began patrolling off the Dutch and Belgian coasts. On 13 May, she embarked members of the Dutch Royal Family at IJmuiden and carried them to safety in the UK. She was then transferred to Dover Command to assist in Operation Dynamo, the Dunkirk evacuation. She made a second trip on 29 May, embarking 766 troops, and a third on 30 May, embarking 799 troops. A fourth trip followed on 31 May, when she embarked 909 troops, landing 440 at Dover. 1 June saw her taking 746 troops back to Dover, and her final run on 2 June brought 878 troops back to the UK. Codrington was one of the few destroyers that had escaped major damage and was able to continue supporting operations after the evacuation had been completed.

Codrington was deployed at Dover on 3 June, carrying out patrols in the Channel, and covering the evacuations from the French Channel ports. On 12 June, she was deployed as the base of the Senior Naval Officer (Afloat) during Operation Cycle, the troop evacuation from Le Havre, returning to Portsmouth once it had been completed. On 15 June, she was supporting the continuing military evacuation from French ports, and remained on patrol against attempts to intercept allied shipping in the North Sea and English Channel.

Sinking
In July 1940 Codrington was deployed out of Dover for convoy defence and patrol duties in the English Channel. She put into port near the end of the month for a boiler clean, alongside the depot ship  in the Submarine Basin. The port came under air attack on 27 July and a bomb fell alongside Codrington. The subsequent explosion broke her back and she sank. She had only three men wounded. The sinking was not made public until 18 May 1945. The wreck was still evident in 1947.

Notes

References

External links
 HMS Codrington at Uboat.net.
 HMS Codrington's prewar and wartime career

 

1929 ships
A- and B-class destroyers
Military history of Dover, Kent
Maritime incidents in July 1940
Ships built by Swan Hunter
Destroyers sunk by aircraft
Ships built on the River Tyne
World War II destroyers of the United Kingdom
World War II shipwrecks in the English Channel
Ships sunk by German aircraft